The 1954 Ball State Cardinals football team was an American football team that represented Ball State Teachers College (later renamed Ball State University) in the Indiana Collegiate Conference (ICC) during the 1954 college football season. In their second season under head coach George Serdula, the Cardinals compiled a 6–2 record (4–2 against ICC opponents), tied for second place out of seven teasm in the ICC, and outscored all opponents by a total of 218 to 113.

Schedule

References

Ball State
Ball State Cardinals football seasons
Ball State Cardinals football